Hydrangea macrocarpa is a species of flowering plant in the family Hydrangeaceae, native to China.

External links
 Hydrangea macrocarpa at www.efloras.org.

macrocarpa
Flora of China